The 1998 Brabantse Pijl was the 38th edition of the Brabantse Pijl cycle race and was held on 29 March 1998. The race started and finished in Alsemberg. The race was won by Johan Museeuw.

General classification

References

1998
Brabantse Pijl